Cellulomonas is a genus of Gram-positive rod-shaped bacteria. One of their main distinguishing features is their ability to degrade cellulose, using enzymes such as endoglucanase and exoglucanase. They are members of the Actinomycetota.

Species
Cellulomonas comprises the following species:

 C. aerilata Lee et al. 2008

 C. algicola Yamamura et al. 2019

 C. biazotea (Kellerman et al. 1913) Bergey et al. 1923 (Approved Lists 1980)

 C. bogoriensis Jones et al. 2005
 C. carbonis Shi et al. 2012

 C. cellasea (Kellerman et al. 1913) Bergey et al. 1923 (Approved Lists 1980)

 C. chitinilytica Yoon et al. 2008
 C. citrea Lee et al. 2020
 C. composti Kang et al. 2007

 C. denverensis Brown et al. 2005

 C. endophytica Li et al. 2020

 C. fimi (McBeth and Scales 1913) Bergey et al. 1923 (Approved Lists 1980)
 C. flavigena (Kellerman and McBeth 1912) Bergey et al. 1923 (Approved Lists 1980)
 C. fulva Dahal et al. 2022

 C. gelida (Kellerman et al. 1913) Bergey et al. 1923 (Approved Lists 1980)
 "C. gilvus" Christopherson et al. 2013
 C. hominis Funke et al. 1996

 C. humilata corrig. (Gledhill and Casida 1969) Collins and Pascual 2000

 C. iranensis Elberson et al. 2000

 "C. macrotermitis" Sun et al. 2018
 C. marina Zhang et al. 2013
 C. massiliensis Lagier et al. 2015
 C. oligotrophica Hatayama et al. 2013

 C. pakistanensis Ahmed et al. 2014

 C. persica Elberson et al. 2000
 C. phragmiteti Rusznyák et al. 2011

 C. rhizosphaerae Tian et al. 2019

 C. shaoxiangyii Tian et al. 2020
 C. soli Hatayama et al. 2013
 "C. taurus" Zhang et al. 2021
 C. telluris Shi et al. 2020
 C. terrae An et al. 2005
 "C. timonensis" Ndongo et al. 2018

 C. uda (Kellerman et al. 1913) Bergey et al. 1923 (Approved Lists 1980)

 C. xylanilytica Rivas et al. 2004

References

External links

Micrococcales
Bacteria genera